John Colson  (1680 – 20 January 1760) was an English clergyman, mathematician, and the Lucasian Professor of Mathematics at Cambridge University.

Life
John Colson was educated at Lichfield School before becoming an undergraduate at Christ Church, Oxford, though he did not take a degree there. 
He became a schoolmaster at Sir Joseph Williamson's Mathematical School in Rochester, and was elected Fellow of the Royal Society in 1713. 
He was Vicar of Chalk, Kent from 1724 to 1740. 
He relocated to Cambridge and lectured at Sidney Sussex College, Cambridge. 
From 1739 to 1760, he was Lucasian Professor of Mathematics. He was also Rector of Lockington, Yorkshire.

Works
In 1726 he published his Negativo-Affirmativo Arithmetik advocating a modified decimal system of numeration. It involved "reduction [to] small figures" by "throwing all the large figures  out of a given number, and introducing in their room the equivalent small figures  respectively".

John Colson translated several of Isaac Newton's works into English, including De Methodis Serierum et Fluxionum in 1736.

See also
Method of Fluxions
Witch of Agnesi

Notes

References

"A Brief History of The Lucasian Professorship of Mathematics at Cambridge University" – Robert Bruen, Boston College, May 1995

External links

1680 births
1760 deaths
18th-century English mathematicians
Academics of the University of Cambridge
English Anglicans
Lucasian Professors of Mathematics
Fellows of the Royal Society